Quechula is the name for a now-submerged village located in Chiapas, Mexico. The town was founded in the mid-1500s by Bartolomé de las Casas. The city was of strategic importance because it laid on the El Camino Real, a road that connected many important settlements in central Mexico, including Mérida and Campeche City. A large, grandiose church was constructed in the town due to the belief that the city would one day boast a large population. However, this never came to pass, and according to Carlos Navarrete, an architect who assisted with a report on the structure, it is unlikely the church ever had an official priest and it was probably served only by priests from other local dioceses.

After a plague affected the town in the late 18th century, Quechula and the church were all but abandoned. The construction of the Malpaso Dam in 1966 resulted in the whole area being flooded. As such, the large church slipped beneath the waves of the Nezahualcóyotl Reservoir. However, in 2002 and 2015, water levels receded so much that the ruins of the old church became visible once again. In 2002, the water was so low that people were even able to walk out to the church ruin and explore it.

References

Histories of cities in Mexico
Destroyed towns
Submerged places